Marcia González Aguiluz (born 16 January 1969) is a Costa Rican politician and lawyer who served as the Minister of Justice and Peace under President Carlos Alvarado Quesada between 2018 and 2020.

She resigned in February 2020. She may run in the 2022 Costa Rican general election.

References 

1969 births
Living people
Female justice ministers
21st-century Costa Rican women politicians
21st-century Costa Rican politicians
Costa Rican women lawyers
People from San José, Costa Rica
Citizens' Action Party (Costa Rica) politicians
Government ministers of Costa Rica
Women government ministers of Costa Rica
20th-century Costa Rican lawyers
21st-century Costa Rican lawyers